The J.R. Brandrup House is a historic house in Mankato, Minnesota, United States.  It was built in 1904 in Neoclassical style.  It was listed on the National Register of Historic Places in 1980 for its local significance in the themes of architecture and education.  It was nominated for its association with J.R. Brandrup (1864–1944), a founder of a private vocational school that became one of Mankato's most important educational institutions.  The house was also nominated for its prominence and elaborate ornamentation within Mankato's Lincoln Park neighborhood. In 1995 it was listed as a contributing property to the Lincoln Park Residential Historic District.

See also
 National Register of Historic Places listings in Blue Earth County, Minnesota

References

1904 establishments in Minnesota
Houses completed in 1904
Houses in Blue Earth County, Minnesota
Houses on the National Register of Historic Places in Minnesota
Mankato, Minnesota
National Register of Historic Places in Blue Earth County, Minnesota
Neoclassical architecture in Minnesota